Kollig is a municipality in the district of Mayen-Koblenz in Rhineland-Palatinate, western Germany. The historic watermill Kolliger Mühle is located in the municipality.

References

Municipalities in Rhineland-Palatinate
Mayen-Koblenz